Alsomitra macrocarpa or the Javan cucumber is a gourd-bearing liana, belonging to the pumpkin family (Cucurbitaceae) from the tropical Asian forests of the Malay Archipelago and the Indonesian islands. Alsomitra is a genus of 34 species of vines found in Southeast Asia, Australia and South America.

The fruits or pepos are football-sized (about 300mm diameter) and bell-shaped, suspended high in the forest canopy, and are densely packed with large numbers of seeds. Remarkably the seeds have large, papery wings and when ripe they fall from the underside of the fruit and glide long distances.

The plant was first described under the name Zanonia macrocarpa in 1825 by Carl Ludwig Blume from fruiting material collected on Mount Parang in Java. In 1843 Max Joseph Roemer published it under the name Alsomitra macrocarpa, including 7 other ill-fitting species in the genus, a genus he did not define. In 1881 Alfred Cogniaux allocated the species to Macrozanonia macrocarpa. The current accepted name is Roemer's Alsomitra macrocarpa.

Seed propagation

The seed or samara of this species is unusual in having two flat bracts extending either side of the seed to form a wing-like shape with the seed embedded along one long edge and the wings angled slightly back from it. As the seed ripens the wings dry and the long edge furthest from the seed curls slightly upwards. When ripe, a hole forms in the bottom of the gourd, the seeds drop off, and their aerodynamic form allows them to glide away from the tree. The seed moves through the air like a butterfly in flight — it gains height, stalls, dips and accelerates, once again producing lift, a process termed phugoid oscillation. In the past it was often found on the decks of ships at sea.

Inspiration in aviation
The seed's relative stability in flight was studied in the 1890s by Friedrich Ahlborn. Known generally as the Zanonia, it inspired several pioneers of early aviation, especially Igo Etrich.

The contemporary pioneer J.W. Dunne also studied the seed but discarded it as inspiration because, although it is stable in pitch and roll, it is not directionally stable.

Over a century later, in 2022, the seed's directional instability inspired the aerodynamic design of a gliding sensor. The device is intended for environmental monitoring and is biodegradable. In use, a flock of sensors would be released from an aircraft and would spread out in random directions as they glided down.

See also
Etrich Taube
Flying wing
Zanonia

References

External links
Fruits and gliding seeds
BBC video on gliding seeds
Fairchild Tropical Botanic Garden

Cucurbitaceae
Decorative fruits and seeds
Flora of Thailand
Flora of Malesia
Flora of New Guinea